"You're a Lady Now" is a song by Australian hard rock group The Angels, released in July 1977 as the second and final single from their self-titled debut album.  

The song first charted on 8 August 1977 where it peaked at number 90 on the Kent Music Report.

Track listing

Personnel 

The Angels members 
 Chris Bailey – bass guitar
 Buzz Throckman – drums
 John Brewster – rhythm guitar, backing vocals
 Rick Brewster – lead guitar
 Doc Neeson – lead vocals
 Production work
 Producers – Vanda & Young
 Studios – Albert Studios, Sydney

Charts

References

The Angels (Australian band) songs
1977 songs
1977 singles
Song recordings produced by Harry Vanda
Song recordings produced by George Young (rock musician)
Songs written by Doc Neeson
Songs written by John Brewster (musician)
Albert Productions singles